Emir Music (born 1 September 1964) is an Austrian/Croatian football manager and former footballer who played as a striker.

Club career
Born in Bosanska Krupa, Bosnia, back then still within Yugoslavia, he started playing with local club NK Bratstvo Bosanska Krupa. Soon after showing his scoring skills at his local club, he has been transferred to the higher league club NK Prijedor before making his first appearance in the Yugoslav First League in 1990 when he was playing for NK Osijek. He then moved to CD Castellón in Spain where he played for 2 seasons. In summer of 1993, he moved to the Austrian first league club Vorwärts Steyr where he played a strong first half of the season, leading the top scorer list prior to getting injured. After just one season, he was transferred to Croatian club Varteks, where he stayed two seasons. In 1996, he made a move back to Austria to SV Wörgl where he became one of the pillars in the offense leading the club as the top scorer into the second league. In 2000, still playing for SV Wörgl in the second league, he retired from professional football.

External links
 

1964 births
Living people
Austrian footballers
NK Osijek players
NK Varaždin players
SK Vorwärts Steyr players
Association football forwards